is a rural district located in Yamagata Prefecture, Japan.
As of October 2013, the district has an estimated population of 29,957 and an area of 282.47 km2. Much of the city of Tsuruoka and a portion of the city of Sakata was formerly part of Higashitagawa District.

Towns and villages
Mikawa
Shōnai

History
Tagawa County was an ancient place name in part of Dewa Province. It was divided into Higashitagawa District and Nishitagawa District after the Meiji restoration. Under the Tokugawa shogunate, much of the area of both districts were ruled as part of Tsuruoka Domain. The area became part of Yamagata Prefecture in 1876. At that time, Higashitagawa District consisted of 259 villages. 
 

With the establishment of the municipality system on April 1, 1889, the district was consolidated into 26 villages. 
 On May 5, 1918, Amarume was raised to town status 
 On May 19, 1922, Fujishima was raised to town status
 On April 1, 1937, Karikawa was raised to town status
 On October 1, 1954, Karikawa merged with the neighboring villages of Kiyokawa and Tachiyazawa to become the town of Tachikawa
On February 1, 1955, the villages of Izumi, Hirose and Toge merged to form the town of Haguro.
 On December 1, 1966, Kushibiki was raised to town status
On June 1, 1968, Mikawa was raised to town status
On July 1, 2005 the towns of Amarume and Tachikawa merged to form the new town of Shōnai.
On October 1, 2005 the city of Tsuruoka, the towns of Fujishima, Haguro and Kushibiki and the village of Asahi, and the town of Atsumi from Nishitagawa District merged into Tsuruoka.

Districts in Yamagata Prefecture